The Beach Boys: An American Family is a 2000 American miniseries written by Kirk Ellis and directed by Jeff Bleckner. It is a dramatization of the early years of The Beach Boys, from their formation in the early 1960s to their peak of popularity as musical innovators, through their late-1960s decline (and Brian Wilson's beginning battle with mental illness), to their re-emergence in 1974 as a nostalgia and "goodtime" act.

The miniseries was shown in two parts on ABC, on February 27 and 28, 2000. It featured a good deal of original studio and session material by the band, which forms the backdrop to the story. Music that couldn't be licensed for the production, but was important to the story (such as the Smile album sessions, and music by criminal Charles Manson, who had collaborated with Dennis Wilson), was filled in with sound-alikes, reminiscent of the original recordings.

In 2000, Brian Wilson stated of the film: "I didn't like it, I thought it was in poor taste. ... And it stunk. I thought it stunk!" He elaborated further: "I didn't like the second part. It wasn't really true to the way things were. I'd like to see another movie if it was done right. But I just sort of turned my back to this one, or my other cheek, or whatever you wanna call it. It was best just to ignore it because it really wasn't true to life." Wilson also felt that he was poorly portrayed by actor Frederick Weller ("He was a little more rough than me") and that there was too much coverage of Charles Manson ("That was a commercial fuckup").

Cast

Awards 
The Beach Boys: An American Family was nominated in nine individual categories at different award ceremonies.

It won three out of those 8 categories that it was nominated in. Listed below is the categories that the movie was nominated in as well as for what award:

2000
Emmy Awards
Outstanding Mini-series
Single-Camera Picture Editing For A Mini-series, Movie Or A Special
Single-Camera Sound Mixing For A Mini-series Or A Movie
Artios Awards
Best Casting For TV Mini-Series
2001
Eddie Awards
Best Edited Miniseries or Motion Picture for Commercial Television (won)
Excellence In Production Design Awards
Best Television Movie or Mini-Series
C.A.S. Awards
Outstanding Achievement In Sound Mixing For A Television Movie-of-the-Week, Mini-Series (won)
DGA Awards
Outstanding Directorial Achievement In Movies For Television (won)
Golden Satellite Awards
Best Mini-series (nom)

References

External links
 

2000 American television series debuts
2000 American television series endings
2000s American drama television series
2000s American television miniseries
American Broadcasting Company original programming
American musical television series
Cultural depictions of the Beach Boys
Cultural depictions of Charles Manson
English-language television shows
Television series by Sony Pictures Television
2000s English-language films